Wesley Low is an American bowler from Palmdale, California.  He uses the two-handed shovel-style delivery with a dominant left hand. He is the 36th bowler in tournament history to record a 900 series or three consecutive perfect games. Low is the youngest bowler to win a Professional Bowlers Association (PBA) Regional Tour event, which he did at the age of 15 as a non-member.  He is a member of PBA since 2019.

He was a member of Team USA in 2014, when he won the all-events gold medal at the World Bowling Youth Championships with a record 18-game total of 4,224, a 234.6 average.

At the Team USA Trials in 2019, he finished second to longtime Team USA member John Janawicz, earning him a spot on the adult version of Team USA for the first time. He won the men's title at the 2019 United States National Amateur Bowling Championships, which were held alongside the Team Trials.

As a youth bowler, he had success in PBA Regional Tour competition, winning four Regional titles as a non-member. He is now a full-time PBA Tour competitor.

Low is a member of the MOTIV Bowling pro staff.

Reference

Year of birth missing (living people)
Living people
American bowling players
People from Palmdale, California
Sportspeople from Los Angeles County, California